Stuart Duncan Macdonald Jack  (8 June 1949 – 16 February 2022) was a British diplomat, latterly serving as the Governor of the Cayman Islands from 2005 until 2009.

Educated at Westcliff High School for Boys; and then Merton College, Oxford, Jack joined the Foreign and Commonwealth Office in 1972 after serving with the VSO is Laos. After joining the Eastern European and Soviet Department, Jack took posts in Tokyo and Moscow. He went on secondment to the Bank of England from 1984 to 1985, and then returning to Tokyo for another four-year posting.

In 1989, Jack served as the FCO's Diplomatic Service Inspector, before being posted to St. Petersburg as Consul-General from 1992 to 1995. He then served as Head of the FCO's Research Analysts cadre from 1996 to 1999, returning to Tokyo as Minister. After a brief spell back in the office in 2003–2004, Jack took his last posting as Governor of the Cayman Islands in 2005, retiring in 2009.

Jack was appointed as a Commander of the Royal Victorian Order (C.V.O.) in 1994 after the Queen's State Visit to St. Petersburg.

Jack died on 16 February 2022, at the age of 72. A statement was issued by Cayman Islands Current Governor Martyn Roper on the 21 February 2022.

Scouting 
Jack was Chief Scout of The Scout Association of the Cayman Islands from October 2006. In his youth, he was involved in Scouting, including time as a Cub Scout.

Offices held

See also

References

External links 
 Cayman Islands Government Web Site
 

1949 births
2022 deaths
20th-century British diplomats
21st-century British diplomats
Alumni of Merton College, Oxford
Commanders of the Royal Victorian Order
Governors of the Cayman Islands